Huntingdon Borough Historic District is a national historic district  located at Huntingdon in Huntingdon County, Pennsylvania. The district includes 521 contributing buildings in the central business district and surrounding residential areas of Huntingdon.  They date from the late-18th century to the early-20th century, and are primarily two- and three-story brick or frame structures.  The buildings are reflective of popular architectural styles including Federal, Italianate, and Queen Anne.  Notable buildings include the county jail (1829), Union Depot (1872), Penn Hunt Hotel (1873-1874), switching tower (c. 1900), Fisher and McMurtie's Store (c. 1850), Reed's Drug Store (1865), Port Building (1875), Iron Front Store (1884), and Blair Building (1889).

It was listed on the National Register of Historic Places in 1986.

2020 Fire 
On May 12, 2020, at approximately midnight, the workshop area of the Blair Building caught fire. More than a hundred people lost their apartments and the entire building was declared a loss.

References

External links
All of the following are located in Huntingdon, Huntingdon County, PA:

Historic American Engineering Record in Pennsylvania
Historic districts on the National Register of Historic Places in Pennsylvania
Historic districts in Huntingdon County, Pennsylvania
Huntingdon, Pennsylvania
National Register of Historic Places in Huntingdon County, Pennsylvania